The Great Northern Steeplechase is New Zealand's richest steeplechase. 

The contestants must clear 25 jumps during the 6400m race, making it one of the great tests of stamina and fitness in thoroughbred racing, for both horse and rider.  A notable feature of the race was the Ellerslie Hill, on the eastern side of the steeplechase course, which the horses must climb three times during the race.  

The race is no longer held at Ellerslie after the Auckland Racing Club sold land for housing development.

History
The inaugural race was won by Macaroni, who carried a weight of 12 stone (76 kg). The record weight carried to victory was 12 stone 13 lb (82.5 kg) by Kiatere in 1907.  One of the most notable winners of the race was Hunterville, who won the race three times in 1983, 1984 and 1985. Hypnotize also achieved three victories, following wins in 2007, 2008 and 2010.

The fastest winning time was 7:39.35 by Ballycastle in 1978, and the slowest was 9:31.50 by Wise Men Say in 2017.  There was a dead-heat in 2001 between Smart Hunter, which had won the Great Northern Hurdles two days earlier, and Sir Avion, which had won the Great Northern Hurdles in 1998.  It was the first dead-heat in a major New Zealand jumping race since the Otago Steeplechase in 1918.

Ken and Ann Browne won the Great Northern Steeplechase a record nine times with Ascona (1977 and 1979), Ardri (1990), Brother Bart (1991), Lord Tennyson (1992), Sydney Jones (1995 and 1997), Smart Hunter (2001, dead-heated with Sir Avion) and Wanderlust (2004).   After Ken's death, Ann Browne has won the race with Fair King (2009), Ima Heroine (2011) and Tom's Myth (2012).  

In 1986 Trudy Thornton was the first woman to ride in a Great Northern Steeplechase. 

The race has been run in early September since 2005, after previously being held in early June.

The race was moved to Te Aroha in:

 2018, raced over 6300m, due to a track upgrade at Ellerslie
 2021, raced over 6200m on October 3rd, due to COVID-19 restrictions in Auckland.

The 2022 race was held at Te Rapa.

Recent results

Previous winners

1986 - Rock Crystal
1985 - Hunterville
1984 - Hunterville
1983 - Hunterville
1982 - Mountain Gold
1981 - Bean's Beau
1980 - Guess Who
1979 - Ascona
1978 - Ballycastle
1977 - Ascona
1976 - Loch Linnhe
1975 - Loch Linnhe
1974 - Specialist
1973 - Bob's Luck
1972 - Brockton
1971 - Brockton
1970 - Spray Doone
1969 - Falada
1968 - Royal Polo
1967 - Eiffel Tower
1966 - Confer
1965 - Smoke Ring
1964 - Johnny Dee 
1963 - Blue Rock
1962 - Sabre 
1961 - Patrick Molloy
1960 - Patrick Molloy
1959 - Ben Vola
1958 - Irish Ace
1957 - Knight's Star
1956 - Hit Parade
1955 - Every Time
1954 - Dunwold
1953 - Dunwold
1952 - Dural
1951 - Redingote
1950 - Jon Rosa
1949 - Golden Reign
1948 - Brookby Song
1947 - Brookby Song
1946 - Our Nation
1945 - Dauber
1944 - Dozie Boy
1943 - Chat
1942 - Dozie Boy
1941 - Streamline
1940 - All Irish
1939 - Survey
1938 - Valpeen
1937 - Irish Comet
1936 - Billy Boy
1935 - Royal Limond
1934 - Valpeen
1933 - Callamart
1932 - Copey
1931 - Master Lu
1930 - Aurora Borealis
1929 - Uralia
1928 - Glendowie
1927 - Beau Cavalier
1926 - Dick
1925 - Sir Rosebery
1924 - Sir Rosebery
1923 - Mary Bruce
1922 - Sea De'il
1921 - Coalition
1920 - Lochella
1919 - Master Lupin
1918 - Waimai
1917 - Gluepot
1916 - El Gallo
1915 - El Gallo
1914 - Peary
1913 - Bercola
1912 - Hautere
1911 - Corazon
1910 - Red McGregor
1909 - Capitol
1908 - Loch Fyne
1907 - Kiatere
1906 - Sol
1905 - Kiatere
1904 - Moccasin
1903 - Haydn
1902 - The Guard
1901 - Moifaa
1900 - Voltigeur II
1899 - Dummy
1898 - Muscatel
1897 - Levanter
1896 - Levanter
1895 - Liberator
1894 - Bombardier
1893 - Despised
1892 - Shillelagh
1891 - Parnell
1890 - Jenny
1889 - Don
1888 - Allegro
1887 - Silvio
1886 - Belle
1885 - Macaroni

See also

 Thoroughbred racing in New Zealand

References 

Horse races in New Zealand